Samuel Sarfati (died 1519), known as Gallo, was a prominent Italian physician and leader of the Jewish community in Rome.

Family 
Samuel Sarfati was the father of Joseph Sarfati (d. 1527), personal physician and medical adviser to Pope Clement VII, and a poet in Hebrew.

Activities in Rome

Status and privileges 
Originally from Provence, Sarfati moved to Rome in 1498. After settling in Rome, Pope Alexander VI extended privileges on him such as permission to treat Christian patients and permission to not wear the special distinguishing Jewish badge that Jews were required to wear. He was a community leader, and represented the Jewish community at the coronation of Pope Julius II in 1503.

Physician to the pope 
In 1504, Sarfati became the Pontifical Archiater during the reign of Pope Julius II. In August 1511, according to Erasmus, Sarfati successfully treated a "serious illness" of Pope Julius II, which some historians theorize might have been syphilis.

Other notable patients 
In 1515, Sarfati became the physician of Giuliano di Lorenzo de' Medici.

References 

16th-century Italian physicians
16th-century Jewish physicians
Medieval Jewish physicians
Physicians from Florence
People from Provence
Provençal Jews
Physicians from Rome
1519 deaths
Year of birth unknown
16th-century Italian Jews